Pražské poštovské noviny was the  first newspaper to be published in Czech. It was first published in Prague, Bohemia, Habsburg Monarchy in 1719 .It ceased publication in 1772 but was revived in 1782 and existed till 1819.

References

Publications established in 1719
Czech-language newspapers